Odites superscripta is a moth in the family Depressariidae. It was described by Edward Meyrick in 1926. It is found in Namibia.

References

Moths described in 1926
Odites
Taxa named by Edward Meyrick